Police General Drs. Widodo Budidarmo (September 1, 1927 – May 5, 2017) was the Chief of the Indonesian National Police (Kapolri) from 1974 to 1978, being the first non-Muslim National Police Chief.

Profile

The eldest child of a sugar factory cashier, Widodo, was born in Kapaskamprung Village, east of Surabaya, on September 1, 1927. Widodo received his general education at a Hollandsch-Inlandsche School from 1934 to 1941, then continued to a Technical School from 1942 to 1946. During his high school education, he participated in the Indonesian War for Independence in East Java, as part of a Student's Brigade.

Widodo then entered the police force, and studied at the School of Police Science until he graduated in 1955. After that, he served as the Head of the Police Organization Division in Purwakarta for three years, from 1956 to 1959 and participated in Operations against the Darul Islam rebellion in West Java.

In early 1960, he went to the United States to study  at the US Coast Guard Officers Candidate School, and completed in 1960. Returning from the US, Widodo served as Head of the Greater Jakarta Police Operations Division (1960) and became heads of several division, becoming Commander of the Air and Water Corps (1964), Regional Commander of Police II North Sumatra (1967), and Head of Regional Police VII Metro Jaya from 1970 to 1974. Widodo was responsible for direct security operations during 1971 general election in Jakarta, after the election he secured the MPR-RI General Assembly which took place in Jakarta. Widodo was appointed a Member of the MPR-RI.

After serving as Chief of the Jakarta Police, on June 25, 1974, Widodo was appointed by President Suharto as National Police Chief. He served as Chief of the National Police from 1974 to 1978. He was also chosen as Vice President of Interpol in 1976.

As police chief Widodo Budidarmo established a Joint Office of 3 Agencies, the Indonesian National Police, the DKI Jakarta Regional Government and Perum AK Jasa Raharja, under the jurisdiction of Polda Metro Jaya. The joint program operated in managing motor vehicle documents, such as STNK and BPKB. During his time as chief, the Government issued Law no. 9 concerning Narcotics, dated July 26, 1976 and a Special Decree of the National Police Chief was issued regarding Satama Satwa to support the operational steps of the Indonesian National Police (1977).

Personal life
On June 4, 1955, Widodo married Darmiati Poeger and had three children: Martini Indah, Agus Aditono and Destina Lestari. Widodo died at the age of 89, Friday morning on 5 May 2017 at 2.30 WIB at Medistra Hospital. He was buried at Kalibata Heroes Cemetery, South Jakarta.

References

1927 births
2017 deaths
Indonesian police officers
People from Surabaya